Francis Shea may refer to:

 Francis Raymond Shea (1913–1994), Roman Catholic Bishop of Evansville, Indiana, 1969–1989
 Francis X. Shea (1926–1977), American Jesuit priest and educator
 Francis M. Shea, American lawyer, law professor and United States government official